The 1852 Democratic National Convention was a presidential nominating convention that met from June 1 to June 5 in Baltimore, Maryland. It was held to nominate the Democratic Party's candidates for president and vice president in the 1852 election. The convention selected former Senator Franklin Pierce of New Hampshire for president and Senator William R. King of Alabama for vice president.

Four major candidates vied for the presidential nomination - Lewis Cass of Michigan, the nominee in 1848, who had the backing of northerners in support of the Compromise of 1850; James Buchanan of Pennsylvania, popular in the South as well as in his home state; Stephen A. Douglas of Illinois, candidate of the expansionists and the railroad interests; and William L. Marcy of New York, whose strength was centered in his home state. Cass led on the first nineteen ballots of the convention, but was unable to win the necessary two-thirds majority. Buchanan pulled ahead on the twentieth ballot, but he too was unable to win a two-thirds majority. Pierce won votes for the first time on the 35th ballot, and was nominated almost unanimously on the 49th ballot.

King was nominated on the second vice presidential ballot, defeating Senator Solomon W. Downs and several other candidates. The Democratic ticket went on to win the 1852 election, defeating the Whig ticket of Winfield Scott and William Alexander Graham.

Convention proceedings
The convention took place at the Maryland Institute for the Promotion of the Mechanic Arts and was called to order by Democratic National Committee chairman Benjamin F. Hallett. Romulus M. Saunders served as the temporary convention chairman and John W. Davis served as the permanent convention president. Delegates at the convention approved a platform that largely mimicked the one adopted in 1848. Two notable additions were the denouncement of a national bank and an endorsement of the Fugitive Slave Act of 1850.

Presidential nomination

Dark Horse candidates

Major Presidential candidates

Minor Presidential candidates

Declined

Balloting 
As Democrats convened in Baltimore in June 1852, four major candidates vied for the nomination - Lewis Cass of Michigan, the nominee in 1848, who had the backing of northerners in support of the Compromise of 1850; James Buchanan of Pennsylvania, popular in the South as well as in his home state; Stephen A. Douglas of Illinois, candidate of the expansionists and the railroad interests; and William L. Marcy of New York, whose strength was centered in his home state. Throughout the balloting, numerous favorite son candidates received a few votes.

With a two-thirds majority required to win, Cass led on the first 19 ballots, with Buchanan second and Douglas and Marcy exchanging third and fourth places. Buchanan took the lead on the 20th ballot and retained it on each of the next nine tallies. Douglas managed a narrow lead on the 30th and 31st ballots. Cass then recaptured first place through the 44th ballot. Marcy carried the next four ballots.

Franklin Pierce of New Hampshire, a former Congressman and Senator, did not get on the board until the 35th ballot, when the Virginia delegation brought him forward as a compromise choice, selecting Pierce as their dark horse by one vote over former New York Congressman and Brooklyn Mayor Henry C. Murphy, and then supporting him as a unit. After being nominated by the Virginia delegation, Pierce's support remained steady until the 46th ballot, when it began to increase at Cass's expense. Pierce's support was consolidated in subsequent voting, and he was nominated nearly unanimously on the 49th ballot.

According to Edward Stanwood, there was "no doubt that the nomination of General Pierce was carefully planned before the convention met. The originator of the scheme was James W. Bradbury, then a senator from Maine, a college mate and lifelong friend of Pierce."

Source:

1st Day of Presidential Balloting / 3rd Day of Convention (June 3, 1852)

2nd Day of Presidential Balloting / 4th Day of Convention (June 4, 1852)

3rd Day of Presidential Balloting / 5th Day of Convention (June 5, 1852)

Vice Presidential nomination

Vice Presidential candidates

Declined 

In a peace gesture to the Buchanan wing of the party, Pierce's supporters allowed Buchanan's allies to fill the second position, knowing that they would select Alabama Senator William R. King, to whom Pierce had no objections. King won the nomination on the second ballot. During the ensuing campaign, King's tuberculosis, which he believed he had contracted while living in Paris, denied him the active behind-the-scenes role that he might otherwise have played, although he worked hard to assure his region's voters with the statement that New Hampshire's Pierce was a "northern man with southern principles."

See also 
 History of the Democratic Party (United States)
 1852 Whig National Convention
 List of Democratic National Conventions
 U.S. presidential nomination convention
 1852 United States presidential election

References

External links 
 Democratic Party Platform of 1852 at The American Presidency Project

1852 United States presidential election
1852 in Maryland
19th century in Baltimore
Political conventions in Baltimore
Maryland Democratic Party
Political events in Maryland
Democratic National Conventions
1852 conferences
June 1852 events